Rodolfo Mayer (February 4, 1910 – January 1, 1985) was a Brazilian actor. He appeared in more than forty films and television series during his career.

Selected filmography
 Minas Conspiracy (1948)
 Leonora of the Seven Seas (1955)

References

Bibliography 
 Flórido, Eduardo Giffoni. Great characters in the history of Brazilian cinema. Fraiha, 1999.

External links 
 

1910 births
1985 deaths
Brazilian male television actors
Brazilian male film actors
Male actors from São Paulo
20th-century Brazilian male actors